Vani (Violinist) is a 1943 Indian Kannada language musical drama film jointly directed by K. Hirannaiah and M. N. Gopal. Produced by T. Chowdaiah, the film featured himself in the lead role along with Bellary Lalitha and Bellary Rathnamala. Actress Pandari Bai and actor Musuri Krishnamurthy made their respective acting debuts in the film. Pandari Bai later became one of the most influential actresses in South Indian cinema. The film was shot and produced at Central Studios in Coimbatore.

The film, although began shooting in 1940, took three years to finally release onto the screens. The film was a box-office failure and the producer incurred losses after the release.

The film's highlight was the two reel length real classical concert of the classical exponent Chembai Vaidyanatha Bhagavathar being shot completely.

Cast
 T. Chowdaiah 
 Bellary Lalitha
 Bellary Rathnamala
 Pandari Bai
 Musuri Krishnamurthy
 K. Hirannaiah
 K. V. Achyutha Rao

References

External sources

1943 films
1940s Kannada-language films
Indian musical drama films
Indian black-and-white films
Films based on music
1940s musical drama films
1943 drama films